Magic: The Gathering finance or MtG finance is the financial management and investment as it pertains to the collectibility and playability of the Magic: The Gathering collectible card game. Investments are typically made in single cards whose value are expected to rise over time such as from a shifting metagame or low quantities of cards that may or may not increase in value due to a growing playerbase and their demand. Like the stock market, cards are generally bought at a low price and/or are sold at a higher price during peak demand at a later date. Speculation is common as investors seek to predict which of 20,000+ unique cards will avoid a reprint thereby creating more demand. Speculation also occurs in the selling of card assets when a reprint is expected in an effort to maximize financial gain and minimize loss. Most financing is done through the buying and selling of cards, though some investors have traded their way to cards of higher value, or expected to gain value in the future. Additionally, some speculators have gone as far as manipulating the market by buying up large quantities of a single card in order to artificially inflate a card's price.

Investments may also go beyond the acquirement of individual cards and may include booster boxes and packs or other unopened game products, complete card sets, or even original artwork featured in the game.

Price memory 
Price memory is the perceived value in a card based on historical prices, especially for popular cards. Even when a card is reprinted or banned, cards may retain some of their value despite indications suggesting its price should decrease. Usually this occurs because players generally hold on to their card collections regardless of its current status. Price memory may also mean that a specific card will lose its value slowly rather than suddenly.

Reprint equity 
Speculators have identified a phenomenon known as reprint equity, which is the amount of in-demand cards that have not been reprinted, or those cards not having a reprint after a substantial period of time. The rate at which Wizards of the Coast reprints cards affects the equity of cards without reprints. Investors have noted that in recent years equity has decreased with a surge in new products, such as the Modern Masters line. A potential avenue for increasing equity is the unbanning of cards in specific formats to increase demand and its value.

Observer and bandwagon effects 

The observer effect has been a tool implemented by speculators in an effort to manipulate the card market. It asserts that "you can't measure something without affecting the results of that measurement". An example of this in MtG Finance would be suggesting a certain card has unrecognised value in a public forum and having the public respond to your advice by buying that card. This would seem to prove your original advice correct as determined by the subsequent price increase of that card and is known as the bandwagon effect.

Cards and formats

Reserved list 

The reserved list is a finite list of cards that Wizards of the Coast has promised never to reprint again specifically to retain their value on the secondary market due to customer complaints. Two exceptions were made with revisions to the list in 2002 and 2010. The list includes cards from the earliest Magic expansions. Because a promise has been made to never reprint these cards, their value is expected to rise over time and have frequently been the target of speculators.

Premium cards 

Premium cards, also known as foils, are often a target of investment due to their increased rarity, especially those from earlier expansions. This can be exacerbated if the premium card is also on the reserved list.

Counterfeits 
Another issue that has been a frequent topic in the uncertainty of MtG finance are counterfeits. As individual card prices rise, Wizards of the Coast's promise not to reprint cards from the reserved list, and cards not being reprinted to demand, counterfeiters have filled this demand and are getting better with each passing year. In 2015, Wizards of the Coast implemented more anti-counterfeit measures by introducing a holographic foil onto cards with specific rarities, in addition to creating a proprietary font.

Commander 
The multiplayer format Commander is a popular target of speculation for many reasons. The game as a whole has far more casual than tournament players and their currently preferred format is Commander. Because Commander also utilizes the entire library of Magic cards and has few banned cards, it becomes ideal for speculation, often relying on the casual player's unfamiliarity with MtG Finance as a whole or potential metagames involving future Commander cards. Websites such as EDHREC are used to ascertain the frequency a card is used, cross-referencing that card with available inventories, and then making a possible speculation.

Modern and Standard formats 
The utility of cards in the metagame of specific game formats, such as Modern and Standard, either through banning, unbanning, or rotation of legal cards, has been a target for speculators. The cards that see frequent tournament play retain a higher value. Cards like these, or the cards they interact with, also known as the domino effect, are speculated on usually before they become a staple of the metagame.

See also
 List of collectible card games
 Digital collectible card game
 List of digital collectible card games

References

Further reading

External links
 MTGGoldfish
 MTGPrice
 EDHREC

Finance